The John A. Belt Building is a historic commercial building located at 227 East Diamond Avenue in Gaithersburg, Montgomery County, Maryland.

Description and history 
It was constructed in 1903, and consists of a two-story rectangular brick building. In the center of the east elevation parapet is raised half-lunette inscribed "1903" and underneath, "J.A. Belt." John A. Belt, was a well known and substantial entrepreneur in Montgomery County in the late 19th and early 20th century.

It was listed on the National Register of Historic Places on August 9, 1984.

References

External links

, including photo in 1983, at Maryland Historical Trust website

Commercial buildings on the National Register of Historic Places in Maryland
Commercial buildings completed in 1903
Buildings and structures in Montgomery County, Maryland
National Register of Historic Places in Montgomery County, Maryland
1903 establishments in Maryland